Niña Amada Mía is the tenth studio album recorded by Mexican singer Alejandro Fernández. Produced by Pedro Ramírez, it is a Mariachi album that contains melodies of composers like Armando Manzanero and Jorge Massias. He shot a video for the song "Niña Amada Mia".

Track listing
 "Por Que No Estas Conmigo" (Homero Aguilar) – 4:11
 "Como Quisiera" (Jorge Massias) – 3:44
 "Que Poca" (Luis Elizalde) – 3:29
 "Me Esta Matando Este Amor" (Armando Manzanero) – 3:28
 "Mujer" (Juan Alazán) – 4:39
 "Que Valga La Pena" (Manuel Eduardo Toscano) – 2:44
 "Por Aqui Paso" (Jorge Massias) – 3:25
 "Niña Amada Mia" (Jorge Massias) – 3:14
 "La Mujer Ideal" (Manuel Eduardo Toscano) – 2:52
 "Dejame" (Raxu) – 3:30
 "La Reina Es El Rey" (Gregorio Hernández Mendoza) – 3:15
 "Matalas" (Manuel Eduardo Toscano) – 2:57

Charts

Album

Singles

Sales and certifications

References

2003 albums
Alejandro Fernández albums